Rhabdophera is a genus of moths in the family Erebidae.

Species
Rhabdophera arefacta (Swinhoe, 1884)

References
Natural History Museum Lepidoptera genus database

Ophiusini
Moth genera